The Cayapas River is in northern Ecuador, flowing northward from the Andes and emptying into the Pacific Ocean near San Lorenzo. The Santiago River is a principal tributary.

Fauna

Fish 
Andinoacara sapayensis - A Cichlid.

See also
List of rivers of Ecuador

References

 Rand McNally, The New International Atlas, 1993.
 Water Resources Assessment of Ecuador

Rivers of Ecuador